Weatherford College (WC; officially Weatherford College of the Parker County Junior College District) is a public community college in Weatherford, Texas, with branch campuses in nearby Wise County, and Granbury.

Organization and administration 
As defined by the Texas Legislature, the official service area of WC includes all of Jack, Palo Pinto, Parker, Hood and Wise Counties.

Ultimate responsibility for governance of the college is vested by state statute in a district board of trustees with seven members. Executive responsibility for administering policies of the board is delegated to the president of the college, who is assisted by the administrative officers.

Student life

Athletics
Baseball, Softball, Men's Basketball, Women's Basketball, Women's Tennis, Men's Golf, and Rodeo

Baseball

34 former Coyote baseball players have played professionally, including four major leaguers:
 Jake Arrieta (born 1986), professional baseball player for the Philadelphia Phillies.
 Ryan Brasier, Major League Pitcher and World Series Champion with the Boston Red Sox
 German Duran, professional baseball infielder.
 Tejay Antone, professional baseball player for the Cincinnati Reds.

Basketball
 Harvey Catchings, former professional basketball player.
 Olga Firsova, former professional basketball player.
 Leta Andrews, holds the record for most wins by a high school basketball coach.
 Stedman Graham, an American educator, author, businessman, and public speaker. 

Golf
 Jerod Turner, professional golfer.

Student housing
In the fall of 2003, Weatherford College opened a new on-campus student community known Coyote Village. A unique alternative to traditional dormitory living, the facility features apartment-style two- and four-bedroom suites for 280 students. Construction began in 2022 on a new resident hall on  campus.

References

External links
 Official website

 
Buildings and structures in Parker County, Texas
Community colleges in Texas
Education in Parker County, Texas
Universities and colleges accredited by the Southern Association of Colleges and Schools
Universities and colleges in the Dallas–Fort Worth metroplex
Educational institutions established in 1869
1869 establishments in Texas
NJCAA athletics